TextAmerica (TA) was one of the first online photo album or moblog sites that allowed users to upload pictures directly from a digital camera or camera phone or images manipulated with photo editing software to a personal page.  Originally a free site, TextAmerica began charging membership fees in July 2006 deleting content uploaded to old free accounts some months after that. It closed in December 2007. The domain name is now being used by a different company and service.

External links
 Original announcement - Textamerica goes fee-only, will delete all old, free moblogs from boingboing.net, June 20, 2006

American photography websites